Aleksandar "Dika" Stojanović (Serbian Cyrillic: Александар Стојановић Дика; born 19 June 1954) is a Serbian former football goalkeeper. He got 2 caps for Yugoslavia.

Career
After playing 5 seasons with his home town club Radnički Kragujevac, he moved, in 1976, to Red Star Belgrade. In the seven years that he played in Belgrade, he won three national championships and one cup. He is also remembered as the goalkeeper that did nothing but applaud after the memorable volley of Diego Maradona, playing in a European Cup match against FC Barcelona. After this successful seasons with Red Star, he decided to move abroad playing in Greece with Egaleo F.C., between 1983 and 1986, and also with Diagoras F.C. in the first half of the 1986-87 season. The rest of that last season he played back in Yugoslavia, this time with the ambitious FK Vojvodina, after helping them win the Yugoslav Second League in 1987, he decided to retire.

He played two matches for the Yugoslavia national football team, both in 1979.

After retiring, he begin his career as a goalkeeping coach having, among others, worked with the renowned coach Slavoljub Muslin in Red Star Belgrade, Levski Sofia and Russian FC Lokomotiv Moscow.

Honours
Radnički Kragujevac
 Yugoslav Second League: 1973–74

Red Star Belgrade
 Yugoslav First League: 1976–77, 1979–80, 1980–81
 Yugoslav Cup: 1981–82
 UEFA Cup: Runner-up 1978–79

Vojvodina
 Yugoslav Second League: 1986–87 - West Division

International
Yugoslavia
 UEFA Under-21 Championship: 1978
 Mediterranean Games: 1979

External links
Profile at reprezentacija.rs

1954 births
Living people
Sportspeople from Kragujevac
Serbian footballers
Yugoslav footballers
Yugoslavia international footballers
Association football goalkeepers
Yugoslav First League players
Super League Greece players
FK Radnički 1923 players
Red Star Belgrade footballers
FK Vojvodina players
Egaleo F.C. players
Serbian expatriate footballers
Expatriate footballers in Greece
Serbian football managers
Red Star Belgrade non-playing staff
Mediterranean Games gold medalists for Yugoslavia
Competitors at the 1979 Mediterranean Games
Mediterranean Games medalists in football